Guitar Slinger is The Brian Setzer Orchestra's second album.

Track listing
 "The House Is Rockin'" (Doyle Bramhall, Stevie Ray Vaughan; arranged by Bob Sandman and Brian Setzer) – 3:02
 "Hoodoo Voodoo Doll" (Setzer; arranged by Michael Acosta and Setzer) – 3:39
 "Town Without Pity" (Dimitri Tiomkin, Ned Washington; arranged by Patrick Williams) – 4:04
 "Rumble in Brighton" (Slim Jim Phantom, Setzer; arranged by Michael Acosta and Setzer) – 3:35
 "The Man with the Magic Touch" (Setzer; arranged by Michael Acosta and Setzer) – 3:24
 "(The Legend of) Johnny Kool" (Setzer; arranged by Bennett Salvay) – 4:09
 "Ghost Radio" (Setzer, Joe Strummer; arranged by Michael Acosta and Setzer) – 3:40
 "(Every Time I Hear) That Mellow Saxophone" (Bumps Blackwell, John Marascalco, Roy Montrell; arranged by Michael Acosta) – 3:29
 "Buzz Buzz" (Setzer; arranged by Michael Acosta and Setzer) – 3:31
 "My Baby Only Cares for Me" (Setzer; arranged by Michael Acosta and Setzer) – 4:09
 "Hey, Louis Prima" (Setzer; arranged by Michael Acosta and Setzer) – 2:57
 "Sammy Davis City" (Setzer, Joe Strummer; arranged by Michael Acosta and Setzer) – 3:55

Personnel
Brian Setzer - guitar, vocals
Steve Fowler - 2nd alto saxophone
Patrick Williams - arranger, orchestration
Michael Acosta - tenor saxophone
Tom Bahler - backing vocals
Alexandra Brown - backing vocals
Sal Cracchiolo - trumpet
Bernie Dresel - drums
Dan Fornero - trumpet
Ray Hermann - multi-instruments
Dan Higgins - multi-instruments
Mark Jones - trombone, orchestration 
Andy Martin - multi-instruments
George McMullen - trombone
Bob Parr - bass
Don Roberts - baritone saxophone
Bennett Salvay - arranger, orchestration
Bob Sandman - tenor saxophone
Carmen Twillie - backing vocals
Michael Vlatkovitch - trombone
Stan Watkins - trumpet
Wayne Bergeron - multi-instruments
Roger Burn - piano, vibraphone
Robbie Hioki - tuba, bass trombone
George Shelby - clarinet, 1st alto saxophone
Charlie Biggs - trumpet
Technical
Allen Sides - recording, mixing
Nick Egan - art direction
Michele Laurita - cover photography

Notes 

1996 albums
The Brian Setzer Orchestra albums
Albums produced by Phil Ramone
Interscope Records albums